Jack Keir is a former politician who was elected to the Legislative Assembly of New Brunswick to represent the electoral district of Fundy-River Valley in the 2006 election.  A member of the New Brunswick Liberal Association, which formed the government, he was shortly thereafter named to the cabinet of Shawn Graham.

See also 
 Proposed sale of NB Power

References

Living people
Members of the Executive Council of New Brunswick
New Brunswick Liberal Association MLAs
1950s births
21st-century Canadian politicians